Barbatula sawadai is a species of stone loach in the genus Barbatula.

Footnotes 

sawadai
Fish described in 2007